The Challenge: All Stars is a spinoff series of the reality competition show The Challenge, which premiered on Paramount+ on April 1, 2021.

Production
The series originally was pitched by Mark Long on social media for a season with "old-school" cast members. His pitch went viral in June 2020, and he started reaching out to former cast members and eventually to The Challenges production company, Bunim/Murray Productions. In August 2020, Long and Bunim/Murray official announced a partnership to work together on the series. Along with being a cast member, Long was also an executive producer. Other executive producers include Julie Pizzi, Justin Booth, Dan Caster and Leanne Mucci, with Jack Reifert as co-executive producer.

On February 24, 2021, the show was officially announced as The Challenge: All Stars, and premiered on the streaming service on April 1, 2021. On October 13, 2021, the series was renewed for a second season, which premiered on November 11, 2021. The series was renewed for a third season, which premiered on May 11, 2022.

Seasons

Series overview

Season 1 (2021)

Season 2 (2021–22)

Season 3 (2022)

References

External links
 

All Stars, The Challenge
Television series by Bunim/Murray Productions
2020s American game shows
2020s American reality television series
2021 American television series debuts
American television spin-offs
English-language television shows
Reality competition television series
Reality television spin-offs
Paramount+ original programming
Television shows set in North America
Television shows set in South America